Leon Goldman (1906–1997) was an American dermatologist and a pioneer in laser medicine.    His research areas included the application of lasers in dermatology,  cancer photodynamic therapy (PDT) and the use of organic dyes in PDT.

In his honor, The American Society for Laser Medicine and Surgery (ASLMS) gives the yearly recognition named Leon Goldman Memorial Award. The Academy of Laser Dentistry also gives an award in recognition of Dr. Goldman. It is called, "The Leon Goldman Award" for Clinical Excellence.

References

External links
 Leon Goldman Memorial Award
 Leon Goldman's obituary at The New York Times
 Leon Goldman's obituary at the Los Angeles Times

1906 births
1997 deaths
American surgeons
Jewish scientists
University of Cincinnati alumni
American people of Polish-Jewish descent
20th-century surgeons